Bala Nandgaonkar (b 1957) is an Indian politician from Maharashtra. He started with Shiv Sena, and later joined Raj Thackeray's Maharashtra Navnirman Sena. He is a three term Member of the Maharashtra Legislative Assembly from Usroli (Murud Janjira)and  Shivadi Assembly Constituency.

Early political life
Bala Nandgaonkar was first elected to the Maharashtra Legislative Assembly on a Shiv Sena ticket in 1995 from Mazgaon, and won again in 1999 and 2004. He was elected to Vidhan Sabha in 2009 from Shivadi on MNS ticket, but lost in 2014.

Maharashtra Navnirman Sena
Bala Nandgaonkar was one of the driving forces along with Raj Thackeray to form the Maharashtra Navnirman Sena.

Positions held 
Maharashtra Legislative Assembly MLA
Terms in office:1995 to 1999,1999–2004,2004–2009 and 2009–2014.

References

Living people
Maharashtra MLAs 2009–2014
Maharashtra Navnirman Sena politicians
Marathi politicians
1957 births
Shiv Sena politicians